This is a list of Israeli actors.

Israeli actors

A
Hiam Abbass
Yael Abecassis - Kadosh, Alila
Alon Abutbul
 Michael Aloni
Gila Almagor  - The House on Chelouche Street
Lior Ashkenazi
Adi Ashkenazi
David Avidan
Mili Avital - Stargate 
Aki Avni

B
Orna Banai 
Yossi Banai
Yehuda Barkan - Charlie Ve'hetzi, Hagiga B'Snuker
Yael Bar Zohar
Michal Bat-Adam
Heinz Bernard
Shmil Ben Ari

C
Asi Cohen - Yossi & Jagger
Eddie Carmel

D
Jason Danino-Holt
Boaz Davidson 
Assi Dayan 
Raz Degan - Alexander

E
Arik Einstein - Lool, Metzitzim
Anat Elimelech
Ronit Elkabetz - Or (My Treasure)

F
Amit Farkash
Oded Fehr - The Mummy
Rami Fortis
Tal Friedman

G
Sasson Gabai
Gal Gadot
Uri Gavriel
Gidi Gov
Yael Grobglas

H
Haya Harareet
Tomer Heymann

I
Shira Haas
Moshe Ivgi
Dana Ivgy - Or (My Treasure)

K
Nir Jacob Kaplan
Makram Khoury
Avi Kornick

L
Sivan Levy - Ima'lle, Burning Mooki
Daliah Lavi - Casino Royale
Yehuda Levi - Yossi & Jagger

M
Aharon Meskin
Maya Maron
Hanna Maron
Juliano Mer-Khamis
Keren Mor 
Moni Moshonov - Hatuna Meuheret
Ido Mosseri

N
Zachi Noy

O
Shaike Ophir

P
Eyal Podell
Natalie Portman - V for Vendetta

R
Shuli Rand - Ushpizin
Michal Batsheva Rand - Ushpizin
Lior Raz
Ze'ev Revach - Charlie Ve'hetzi, Hagiga B'Snuker
Hanna Rieber
Agam Rodberg
Sasha Roiz
Hanna Rovina
Agam Rodberg

S
Sirak M. Sabahat
Jonathan Sagall
Ruth Sagall
Maya Shoef
Gene Simmons 
Niv Sultan

T
Alona Tal
Noa Tishby
Chaim Topol - Fiddler on the Roof
Tuvia Tzafir
Yon Tumarkin

V
Yedidya Vital

Y
Michal Yannai
Eli Yatzpan
Galia Yishai

Z
Uri Zohar
Ayelet Zorer (Ayelet July Zurer)
Bat-Sheva Zeisler

See also
 List of Israelis
 Culture of Israel

 
Lists of actors by nationality
Actors
Israeli film-related lists
Israeli television-related lists